ISO/IEC 8859 is a joint ISO and IEC series of standards for 8-bit character encodings. The series of standards consists of numbered parts, such as ISO/IEC 8859-1, ISO/IEC 8859-2, etc. There are 15 parts, excluding the abandoned ISO/IEC 8859-12. The ISO working group maintaining this series of standards has been disbanded.

ISO/IEC 8859 parts 1, 2, 3, and 4 were originally Ecma International standard ECMA-94.

Introduction
While the bit patterns of the 95 printable ASCII characters are sufficient to exchange information in modern English, most other languages that use Latin alphabets need additional symbols not covered by ASCII. ISO/IEC 8859 sought to remedy this problem by utilizing the eighth bit in an 8-bit byte to allow positions for another 96 printable characters. Early encodings were limited to 7 bits because of restrictions of some data transmission protocols, and partially for historical reasons. However, more characters were needed than could fit in a single 8-bit character encoding, so several mappings were developed, including at least ten suitable for various Latin alphabets.

The ISO/IEC 8859 standard parts only define printable characters, although they explicitly set apart the byte ranges 0x00–1F and 0x7F–9F as "combinations that do not represent graphic characters" (i.e. which are reserved for use as control characters) in accordance with ISO/IEC 4873; they were designed to be used in conjunction with a separate standard defining the control functions associated with these bytes, such as ISO 6429 or ISO 6630. To this end a series of encodings registered with the IANA add the C0 control set (control characters mapped to bytes 0 to 31) from ISO 646 and the C1 control set (control characters mapped to bytes 128 to 159) from ISO 6429, resulting in full 8-bit character maps with most, if not all, bytes assigned. These sets have ISO-8859-n as their preferred MIME name or, in cases where a preferred MIME name is not specified, their canonical name. Many people use the terms ISO/IEC 8859-n and ISO-8859-n interchangeably. ISO/IEC 8859-11 did not get such a charset assigned, presumably because it was almost identical to TIS 620.

Characters
The ISO/IEC 8859 standard is designed for reliable information exchange, not typography; the standard omits symbols needed for high-quality typography, such as optional ligatures, curly quotation marks, dashes, etc. As a result, high-quality typesetting systems often use proprietary or idiosyncratic extensions on top of the ASCII and ISO/IEC 8859 standards, or use Unicode instead.

An inexact rule based on practical experience states that if a character or symbol was not already part of a widely used data-processing character set and was also not usually provided on typewriter keyboards for a national language, it did not get in. Hence the directional double quotation marks « and » used for some European languages were included, but not the directional double quotation marks “ and ” used for English and some other languages.

French did not get its œ and Œ ligatures because they could be typed as 'oe'. Likewise, Ÿ, needed for all-caps text, was dropped as well. Albeit under different codepoints, these three characters were later reintroduced with ISO/IEC 8859-15 in 1999, which also introduced the new euro sign character €. Likewise Dutch did not get the ĳ and Ĳ letters, because Dutch speakers had become used to typing these as two letters instead.

Romanian did not initially get its Ș/ș and Ț/ț (with comma) letters, because these letters were initially unified with Ş/ş and Ţ/ţ (with cedilla) by the Unicode Consortium, considering the shapes with comma beneath to be glyph variants of the shapes with cedilla. However, the letters with explicit comma below were later added to the Unicode standard and are also in ISO/IEC 8859-16.

Most of the ISO/IEC 8859 encodings provide diacritic marks required for various European languages using the Latin script. Others provide non-Latin alphabets: Greek, Cyrillic, Hebrew, Arabic and Thai. Most of the encodings contain only spacing characters, although the Thai, Hebrew, and Arabic ones do also contain combining characters.

The standard makes no provision for the scripts of East Asian languages (CJK), as their ideographic writing systems require many thousands of code points. Although it uses Latin based characters, Vietnamese does not fit into 96 positions (without using combining diacritics such as in Windows-1258) either. Each Japanese syllabic alphabet (hiragana or katakana, see Kana) would fit, as in JIS X 0201, but like several other alphabets of the world they are not encoded in the ISO/IEC 8859 system.

The parts of ISO/IEC 8859
ISO/IEC 8859 is divided into the following parts:

Each part of ISO/IEC 8859 is designed to support languages that often borrow from each other, so the characters needed by each language are usually accommodated by a single part. However, there are some characters and language combinations that are not accommodated without transcriptions. Efforts were made to make conversions as smooth as possible. For example, German has all of its seven special characters at the same positions in all Latin variants (1–4, 9, 10, 13–16), and in many positions the characters only differ in the diacritics between the sets. In particular, variants 1–4 were designed jointly, and have the property that every encoded character appears either at a given position or not at all.

Table

unassigned code points.
new additions in ISO/IEC 8859-7:2003 and ISO/IEC 8859-8:1999 versions, previously unassigned.

Relationship to Unicode and the UCS
Since 1991, the Unicode Consortium has been working with ISO and IEC to develop the Unicode Standard and ISO/IEC 10646: the Universal Character Set (UCS) in tandem. Newer editions of ISO/IEC 8859 express characters in terms of their Unicode/UCS names and the U+nnnn notation, effectively causing each part of ISO/IEC 8859 to be a Unicode/UCS character encoding scheme that maps a very small subset of the UCS to single 8-bit bytes. The first 256 characters in Unicode and the UCS are identical to those in ISO/IEC-8859-1 (Latin-1).

Single-byte character sets including the parts of ISO/IEC 8859 and derivatives of them were favoured throughout the 1990s, having the advantages of being well-established and more easily implemented in software: the equation of one byte to one character is simple and adequate for most single-language applications, and there are no combining characters or variant forms. As Unicode-enabled operating systems became more widespread, ISO/IEC 8859 and other legacy encodings became less popular. While remnants of ISO 8859 and single-byte character models remain entrenched in many operating systems, programming languages, data storage systems, networking applications, display hardware, and end-user application software, most modern computing applications use Unicode internally, and rely on conversion tables to map to and from other encodings, when necessary.

Current status
The ISO/IEC 8859 standard was maintained by ISO/IEC Joint Technical Committee 1, Subcommittee 2, Working Group 3 (ISO/IEC JTC 1/SC 2/WG 3). In June 2004, WG 3 disbanded, and maintenance duties were transferred to SC 2. The standard is not currently being updated, as the Subcommittee's only remaining working group, WG 2, is concentrating on development of Unicode's Universal Coded Character Set.

The WHATWG Encoding Standard, which specifies the character encodings permitted in HTML5 which compliant browsers must support, includes most parts of ISO/IEC 8859, except for parts 1, 9 and 11, which are instead interpreted as Windows-1252, Windows-1254 and Windows-874 respectively. Authors of new pages and the designers of new protocols are instructed to use UTF-8 instead.

See also 
 List of computer character sets
 Number Forms
 RPL character set (An ISO/IEC 8859-1 superset on HP calculators, referred to as "ECMA-94" as well)
 DEC Multinational Character Set (MCS)
 DEC National Replacement Character Set (NRCS)

Notes

References 

 Published versions of each part of ISO/IEC 8859 are available, for a fee, from the ISO catalogue site and from the IEC Webstore.
 PDF versions of the final drafts of some parts of ISO/IEC 8859 as submitted to the ISO/IEC JTC 1/SC 2/WG 3 for review & publication are available at the WG 3 web site:
 ISO/IEC 8859-1:1998 - 8-bit single-byte coded graphic character sets, Part 1: Latin alphabet No. 1 (draft dated February 12, 1998, published April 15, 1998)
 ISO/IEC 8859-4:1998 - 8-bit single-byte coded graphic character sets, Part 4: Latin alphabet No. 4 (draft dated February 12, 1998, published July 1, 1998)
 ISO/IEC 8859-7:1999 - 8-bit single-byte coded graphic character sets, Part 7: Latin/Greek alphabet (draft dated June 10, 1999; superseded by ISO/IEC 8859-7:2003, published October 10, 2003)
 ISO/IEC 8859-10:1998 - 8-bit single-byte coded graphic character sets, Part 10: Latin alphabet No. 6 (draft dated February 12, 1998, published July 15, 1998)
 ISO/IEC 8859-11:1999 - 8-bit single-byte coded graphic character sets, Part 11: Latin/Thai character set (draft dated June 22, 1999; superseded by ISO/IEC 8859-11:2001, published 15 December 2001)
 ISO/IEC 8859-13:1998 - 8-bit single-byte coded graphic character sets, Part 13: Latin alphabet No. 7 (draft dated April 15, 1998, published October 15, 1998)
 ISO/IEC 8859-15:1998 - 8-bit single-byte coded graphic character sets, Part 15: Latin alphabet No. 9 (draft dated August 1, 1997; superseded by ISO/IEC 8859-15:1999, published March 15, 1999)
 ISO/IEC 8859-16:2000 - 8-bit single-byte coded graphic character sets, Part 16: Latin alphabet No. 10 (draft dated November 15, 1999; superseded by ISO/IEC 8859-16:2001, published July 15, 2001)
 ECMA standards, which in intent correspond exactly to the ISO/IEC 8859 character set standards, can be found at:
 Standard ECMA-94: 8-Bit Single Byte Coded Graphic Character Sets - Latin Alphabets No. 1 to No. 4 2nd edition (June 1986)
 Standard ECMA-113: 8-Bit Single-Byte Coded Graphic Character Sets - Latin/Cyrillic Alphabet 3rd edition (December 1999)
 Standard ECMA-114: 8-Bit Single-Byte Coded Graphic Character Sets - Latin/Arabic Alphabet 2nd edition (December 2000)
 Standard ECMA-118: 8-Bit Single-Byte Coded Graphic Character Sets - Latin/Greek Alphabet (December 1986)
 Standard ECMA-121: 8-Bit Single-Byte Coded Graphic Character Sets - Latin/Hebrew Alphabet 2nd edition (December 2000)
 Standard ECMA-128: 8-Bit Single-Byte Coded Graphic Character Sets - Latin Alphabet No. 5 2nd edition (December 1999)
 Standard ECMA-144: 8-Bit Single-Byte Coded Character Sets - Latin Alphabet No. 6 3rd edition (December 2000)
 ISO/IEC 8859-1 to Unicode mapping tables as plain text files are at the Unicode FTP site.
 Informal descriptions and code charts for most ISO/IEC 8859 standards are available in ISO/IEC 8859 Alphabet Soup (Mirror)

 
Character sets
Ecma standards
08859